Susan Beckman is a former state representative from Arapahoe County, Colorado. A Republican, Beckman represented Colorado House of Representatives District 38, which encompasses the communities of Bow Mar, Centennial, Columbine, Columbine Valley, and Littleton, in Arapahoe County, Colorado.

Education 
Beckman earned a degree in communications from Colorado State University Pueblo. Beckman earned a certificate in state and local government from Harvard Kennedy School of Executive Education.

Career 
In 1999, Beckman became a councilwoman on the Littleton City Council. She served until 2001 when she became a commissioner on the Arapahoe County Board of County Commissioners until 2013.

On November 8, 2016, Beckman won election to become a member of Colorado House of Representatives for District 38. Beckman defeated Robert E. Bowen with 57.83% of the votes. 
On November 6, 2018, as an incumbent, Beckman won the election and continued serving District 38. Beckman defeated Chris Kolker with 50.39% of the votes and a margin of 374 votes out of 47,954 cast.

In January 2019, Rep. Beckman announced that she was running for Colorado Republican Party chair in the state GOP's upcoming reorganization and intended to resign her House District 38 seat at the end of the General Assembly's 120-day session if she wins the party election.

In January 2020, Rep. Beckman resigned her Colorado State Representative seat effective immediately to take a job with the Trump administration. She announced her move on the House floor but did not specify what her new job will be.

Personal life 
Beckman's husband is Bruce. They have two children.

References

External links
 Campaign website
 State House website
 Susan Beckman at ourcampaigns.com

21st-century American politicians
21st-century American women politicians
Living people
Republican Party members of the Colorado House of Representatives
People from Arapahoe County, Colorado
Colorado State University Pueblo alumni
Women state legislators in Colorado
Year of birth missing (living people)
County commissioners in Colorado